Neboulos was a South Slavic or Bulgar military commander in the service of the Byzantine emperor Justinian II (r. 685–695 and 705–711), who defected with many of his men to the Arabs during the crucial Battle of Sebastopolis.

In 688/9, Justinian II forcibly transplanted Slavic populations from the Balkans and settled them in the depopulated Opsician Theme. From them, he recruited a special military corps, allegedly 30,000 strong, which was called in Greek λαός περιούσιος, "the chosen people". Neboulos's own origin is disputed between scholars, with some suggesting a Bulgar origin and others a South Slavic one. According to the account of Patriarch Nikephoros, he was chosen from among the nobility of the Slav settlers.

The Byzantines engaged the Arabs in the Battle of Sebastopolis and initially had the upper hand until Neboulos, with the bulk (some 20,000) of his men, deserted the Byzantine lines and went over to the Arabs, allegedly bribed by the Arab commander, Muhammad ibn Marwan. Some sources report, probably with great exaggeration, how thereafter Justinian took his revenge on the remaining Slavs: he disbanded the corps, and killed or sold into slavery many of its men, as well as the families of the deserters. Neboulos and his men, on the other hand, were settled by the Umayyads in Syria, and were employed in subsequent Arab forays into Byzantine-held Asia Minor.

References

Sources

South Slavic history
7th-century Byzantine people
7th-century Bulgarian people
7th-century Slavs
Byzantine defectors
Byzantine generals
Byzantine people of the Arab–Byzantine wars
Byzantine people of Slavic descent
7th-century people from the Umayyad Caliphate